is a shallow freshwater lake in Tomakomai, Iburi Subprefecture, Hokkaidō, Japan. It is within the Lake Utonai Sanctuary, created in 1981 as the first bird sanctuary designated in Japan. It later became the fourth Ramsar site in Japan in 1989.

Other names include Kim-un-to, Kimke-to, Utnay-to, Utnay-tō, Utonai-numa, and Utsunai-numa.

Etymology and history
There are multiple original Ainu names for Lake Utonai, including キムント (kim-un-to), meaning "a wetland with a mountain", and キムケト (kimke-to), meaning "wetland deep in the mountains".

Lake Utonai was the first designated bird sanctuary in Japan, through the efforts of the Wild Bird Society of Japan and the city of Tomakomai in 1981. The lake and the surrounding area was designated a Ramsar site in Japan in July 1989, the fourth such designation in Japan. It is designated a Special Protection Area of a National Wildlife Protection Area.

Geography
Around the lake is a wide area of swampy wetland dotted with small ponds and bogs, all part of the Bibi River floodplain. The Yūfutsu River, which is part of the Abira River drainage system, flows into the lake through the eastern part of Tomakomai and also drains the lake. The Bibi, Otarumappu, and Tokisatamappu rivers also empty into the lake.

Fauna and flora
The lake and the surrounding wetlands support a diverse population of animals and plants. More than 260 types of birds have been sighted in the area, including many that use Lake Utonai as a migration stop and wintering area. Thousands of ducks, swans, and geese use it, including the greater white-fronted goose, whooper swan, and tundra swan. Daily totals during peak migration can reach tens of thousands in one day. Other birds recorded there include the Canada goose, the Oriental stork, the northern goshawk, the white-tailed eagle, Steller's sea eagle, the peregrine falcon, the red-crowned crane, the eastern marsh harrier, and the yellow-breasted bunting.

Over 3900 types of insects have been identified as inhabiting the lake and its environs.

Lake Utonai is surrounded by a reed-sedge swamp, swamp forest, and stands of wild rice. Water plants such as tanukimo and hishi grow in the water, with clusters of makomo, yoshi, mizunara and haskap, and others growing along the edges. East Asian alder and Magnolia praecocissima var. borealis grow prolifically around the lake. More than 500 varieties of plants have been identified in and around the lake.

Facilities
The creation of the Lake Utonai Sanctuary began in May 1976 as an effort to protect habitat for the Okinawa woodpecker. In November that same year, a foundation was established to work toward that goal, collecting over ¥100 million. In May 1979, Lake Utonai was selected as the location for the first bird sanctuary for the foundation in order to protect it from increased development in the area. The groundbreaking for the nature center was held in February 1980, and volunteer camps were held in August 1980 and March 1981. The nature center officially opened on 10 May 1981. 

The sanctuary protects , including Lake Utonai and much of the surrounding area. This area is the only remaining wetland area on the Yūfutsu flood plain.

See also
List of Ramsar sites in Japan

References

External links
 
 ウトナイ湖サンクチュアリ (official Utonai-ko Sanctuary site)

Lakes of Hokkaido
Ramsar sites in Japan